Wrong Turn is a 2003 slasher film directed by Rob Schmidt and written by Alan B. McElroy. The film stars Desmond Harrington, Eliza Dushku, Emmanuelle Chriqui, Jeremy Sisto, Kevin Zegers, and Lindy Booth. The film follows a group of six individuals being stalked by a cannibalist family in the woods.

Development for the film began in 2001 when it was announced Summit Entertainment and Newmarket Group teamed to produce Wrong Turn, a 1970s-style horror pic to be directed by Schmidt, while McElroy wrote the script. The film was a co-production between Summit and Constantin Film, with Stan Winston designing the creature effects and serving as a producer.

Wrong Turn was theatrically released in the United States on May 30, 2003, by 20th Century Fox. The film received mixed reviews from critics, who praised its premise, but criticized its script, underdeveloped characters and horror clichés. It grossed over $28 million worldwide against a $12 million budget.

Plot
College students Rich Stoker and Halley Smith are rock climbing in a remote forest of West Virginia. When Rich reaches the top of a cliff they are climbing, he is suddenly murdered before he can help Halley up. Someone begins to yank Halley up the cliff, forcing her to cut the rope and fall to the ground. She attempts to escape but is caught in a line of barbed wire and pulled back into the woods, screaming. She is killed off-screen.

Sometime later, medical student Chris Flynn drives through the mountains of West Virginia on his way to a business meeting. He stops at a gas station to ask directions, and the elderly owner named Maynard is of no help. Chris finds a map and decides to go down Bear Mountain Road. He collides with a stopped car whose tires have been punctured. The car belongs to a group of college students on a camping trip: Jessie, Carly, Scott, Evan and Francine. They soon discover their tire puncture was no accident and find barbed wire wrapped around it and realize someone did this intentionally.

Evan and Francine stay to watch the cars while the others go to find help. Evan disappears after he hears something from the woods, and Francine finds his ear on the ground. As she backs away in horror, barbed wire is forced into her mouth by a mysterious figure, who garrotes her with it. The remaining group find an isolated cabin and go inside to use the phone, horrified to find human body parts in the house. They are forced to hide inside when the occupants return home. Three cannibalistic inbred mountain men Three Finger (real name, Andrei), Saw Tooth (real name, Andu) and One Eye (real name, Tudor) enter the cabin with Francine's corpse and the hiding group watch as her body is dismembered and eaten.

After the cannibals fall asleep, the group attempts to escape but their captors awaken and chase them in the forest. The group find cars left from previous victims and try to make up an escape plan. Chris gets shot in the leg while trying to distract the cannibals, and the girls take him to a truck, where Evan's body spills out. Scott attempts another diversion for the other three to escape but gets killed with arrows instead. Jessie, Carly, and Chris stumble upon an old watchtower with an old radio and try to call for help. The cannibals arrive and are alerted when the radio starts responding to the group's call. Unable to get inside, the attackers set the tower on fire. The protagonists escape by jumping out and into the trees, triggering a chase in which Carly is decapitated by Three Finger.

Chris pulls a branch while Jessie lures the attacker for the former to release it, knocking him down. Jessie and Chris flee and hide in a cave until morning. The cannibals find them, pushing Chris down the hill, then kidnapping Jessie and taking her back to their cabin. Chris survives the fall and meets a police officer, but the officer is killed by Saw Tooth, who shoots him in the eye with an arrow. Chris hitches a ride by holding onto the underside of the truck as Saw Tooth drives it back to the cabin, where Jessie has been tied down to a bed in preparation to be eaten and watches fearfully as the cannibals chop up the dead policeman.

Before they can move on to Jessie, Chris sets the building on fire and drives the truck through the wall. He fights off the three cannibals and frees Jessie and they escape as Chris kills the cannibals by blowing up the cabin. The pair then drive out of the forest in the cannibals' pickup truck and stumble upon Meynard's gas station nearby; Chris takes the map before he and Jessie leave.

In a mid-credits scene, a deputy sheriff who had received the radio call earlier investigates the remains of the destroyed cabin. Laughing insanely, Three Finger, who survived the explosion, rises and kills the deputy.

Cast
Desmond Harrington as Chris Flynn
Eliza Dushku as Jessie Burlingame
Emmanuelle Chriqui as Carly Numan
Jeremy Sisto as Scott Korbee
Kevin Zegers as Evan Ross
Lindy Booth as Francine Childes
Julian Richings as Andrei (Three Finger) 
Garry Robbins as Andu (Saw Tooth)
Ted Clark as Tudor (One Eye)
Yvonne Gaudry as Halley Smith
Joel Harris as Richard (Rich) Stoker
David Huband as Trooper
Wayne Robson as Old Man
James Downing as Trucker

Production
Development for the film began in 2001 when it was announced Summit Entertainment and Newmarket Group teamed to produce Wrong Turn, a 1970s-style horror pic to be directed by Rob Schmidt. Alan McElroy ("Spawn") wrote the script. The movie was a co-production, Summit Entertainment and Constantin Films, with Stan Winston designing the creature effects and serving as a producer. Inking a deal with Fox-based Regency Enterprises, the co-financiers of Wrong Turn secured domestic distribution through Fox. Fox reportedly had trouble securing an R-rating from the MPAA due to the film's intense violence with many of the TV spots for the film also refused approval, this is possibly one of the reasons why subsequent Wrong Turn movies were released straight to video.

Music
Two soundtracks were released; one contains the original film score, and the other contains popular music.

Soundtrack

Track listing
"In Stance" – Eris
"Bloody Fingers" – Jet Black Summer
"Every Famous Last Word" – Miracle of 86
"Never Said Anything" – The Belles
"Why Would I Want to Die?" – Grandaddy
"Haunted" – King Black Acid
"Three Murders" – Deadman
"Ex" – Tara King Theory
"Birthday" – Simple
"Even the Scars Forget the Wound" – Gruvis Malt
 "He's a Killer" – DJ Swamp
"Bring the Pain"/"Multiple Incisions" – Candiria
"If Only" – Queens of the Stone Age
"Wish I May" – Breaking Benjamin

Score

Track listing
"Dark Forest"
"Wrong Turn Title"
"Mountain Men"
"Cabin In The Woods"
"Adventure Begins"
"Mountain Men At Home"
"Francine Dies"
"Jessie"
"Scott Becomes Prey"
"Bear Trap"
"Escape From Cabin"
"Jessie Taken Hostage"
"Fire In The Watchtower"
"Grim Discovery"
"Are We Safe?"
"They Got Carly"
"Killing Mountain Men"
"We Are Alive"
"Three Finger is Back"

Reception
Rotten Tomatoes, a review aggregator, reports that 40% of 83 surveyed critics gave the film a positive review; the average rating was 4.22/10. The consensus is: "An unremarkable slasher flick that fails to distinguish itself from others of its ilk". On Metacritic, Wrong Turn have a score of 32 out of a 100 based on 17 critics, indicating "generally unfavorable reviews". Audiences polled by CinemaScore gave the film an average grade of "C−" on an A+ to F scale.

Barbara Ellen of The Times wrote "This could have been a half decent cross between a Romero zombie movie and The Texas Chainsaw Massacre but in the end the gore is so ridiculously overdone and the script so lame, that it undermines all sense of suspense". William Thomas of Empire said "It's better than any of the official Texas Chainsaw Massacre sequels. Which is probably a good thing". Scott Foundas of Variety criticized the Wrong Turn for being "A negative pickup by Fox", adding that "[it was] dumped into theaters on Friday without benefit of press previews", resulting in "frightless torpor".

A one out of four stars was awarded to the film by Marc Savlov of The Austin Chronicle who wrote "This was already tired stuff when cult fave Sleepaway Camp came out in 1983, and it's downright comatose by now". BBC's Nev Pierce gave the film two out of five, while Anita Gates of The New York Times called it "[a] lazy would-be horror film".

Sequels

Wrong Turn was followed by several films including two sequels, Wrong Turn 2: Dead End (2007) and Wrong Turn 3: Left for Dead (2009), two prequels leading to the events of the original film, Wrong Turn 4: Bloody Beginnings (2011) and Wrong Turn 5: Bloodlines (2012), and a reboot, Wrong Turn 6: Last Resort (2014).

In October 2018, another reboot simply titled Wrong Turn (2021) was announced. The film was written by original film's writer Alan B. McElroy and directed by Mike P. Nelson. Principal photography for the movie began on September 9, 2019. Though initially planned for a 2020 release, the film was held until 2021 due to the COVID-19 pandemic. After an announcement on December 16, 2020, the film was domestically released theatrically for a one night run on January 26, 2021.

References

External links

2003 horror films
2000s horror thriller films
2003 independent films
2000s serial killer films
2000s slasher films
20th Century Fox films
American horror thriller films
American independent films
American slasher films
Canadian slasher films
English-language Canadian films
German slasher films
English-language German films
Films about cannibalism
Films set in West Virginia
Films shot in Hamilton, Ontario
Films shot in Toronto
Incest in film
1
Constantin Film films
Summit Entertainment films
Films scored by Elia Cmíral
2000s English-language films
2000s American films
2000s Canadian films
2000s German films